was a member of the Japanese House of Representatives. He was a member of the Rikken Seiyūkai, the Chūseikai, and the Kenseikai.

Early life 
Okabe was born in Kasuga-mura, Shinano Province (present-day Saku, Nagano) on September 30, 1864. He was the second son of Yamon Okabe. After attending Ueda Middle School (now called Ueda High School), Okabe studied English at Dōjinsha in Tokyo. In 1885 he followed Korekiyo Takahashi to America. While living in Oakland in 1889, he converted to Christianity. He then moved to the Kingdom of Hawaii with Harvey Saburo Hayashi in the same year.

Hawaii 
In Hawaii, Okabe was ordained on July 20, 1890, and started the first Japanese church in Hilo, the Church of the Holy Cross, on January 18, 1891. He was transferred to Honolulu in 1893. Shortly after transferring to Honolulu, he returned to Japan to recruit more Japanese missionaries, including Takie Okumura and Shiro Sokabe. He also inherited the "Hawai Shinbun", a Japanese-language newspaper, from Jukichi Uchida in 1894, but quickly transferred it to Kenichiro Hoshida.

During the overthrow of the Kingdom of Hawaii, Okabe was on the side of the anti-monarchists. He joined the Citizens' Guard and worked to quell riots, fearing that the bad reputation of Japanese immigrants at the time would grow worse if they rioted. Once the riots were calmed, the royalists within the Japanese community didn't trust Okabe, and he left Hawaii in 1895.

After his time in Hawaii, he returned to the American mainland and attended the University of California. After graduation, he earned a doctorate at the University of Chicago. He also studied abroad at the London School of Economics, Heidelberg University, and the University of Paris.

Japan 
In 1899 Okabe returned to Japan and worked as a translator for the Ministry of Foreign Affairs. After that he helped Hirobumi Ito and Kunitake Watanabe form the Rikken Seiyūkai. He also became the head writer of the Hokkai Times. When the Russo-Japanese War started Okabe worked as the director of foreign correspondents. After the war Okabe became the head of Yingkou's military government's diplomacy, resident affairs, and administrative divisions in quick succession.

Okabe was elected to office during the Japanese General Election, 1912. He was re-elected four times.

He died on July 8, 1925. On the previous day he had been awarded the title Jushi-i.

References

Bibliography 

 
 
 
 

1925 deaths
1864 births
People from Nagano Prefecture
People of the Russo-Japanese War
Japanese newspaper editors
Japanese journalists
Japanese businesspeople
Members of the House of Representatives (Empire of Japan)